Hugo Barrette (born 4 July 1991 in Cap-Aux-Meules, Quebec) is a Canadian cyclist, specializing in track time trials. Barrette is from the Magdalen Islands, Quebec and now lives in Santa Monica, California, in the USA.

Records 
On 28 August 2014 at Aguascalientes, he set a new Canadian record in the flying 200 m time trial of 9.77 seconds. The following day, he broke the 1 km against the clock record with a time of 1:00:9. With his teammates Joseph Veloce and Stéphane Cossette, he also holds the Canadian record in team sprints; the team achieved a time of 43.922 seconds at the Panamerican Cycling Championships in Mexico City on 7 February 2013.

Injuries 
In 2015, Hugo Barrette survived a horrific crash while training for a UCI World Cup in Cali, Colombia, with two broken lumbar vertebrae, a broken nose, split lip, concussion, neck dislocation and severe contusions. At the World Track Cycling Championships in Pruszkow, Poland, Hugo Barrette had an accident as he exited the fourth turn at full speed while the German Lea Sophie Friedrich was climbing the track. During the same year, in 2019, he fell off his bike and broke his scapula, one of the strongest bones. Since he had qualified to represent Canada at the 2020 Summer Olympics, the postponement of one year of the Tokyo Olympics was a blessing.

Tokyo 2020 Olympic Games 
Hugo Barrette represented Canada at the 2020 Summer Olympics.

References

External links

Canadian expatriate sportspeople in the United States
Canadian male cyclists
Living people
1991 births
Cyclists at the 2015 Pan American Games
Cyclists from Quebec
People from Gaspésie–Îles-de-la-Madeleine
Olympic cyclists of Canada
Cyclists at the 2016 Summer Olympics
Pan American Games gold medalists for Canada
Pan American Games bronze medalists for Canada
Pan American Games medalists in cycling
Cyclists at the 2018 Commonwealth Games
Medalists at the 2015 Pan American Games
Commonwealth Games competitors for Canada
Cyclists at the 2020 Summer Olympics
Big Brother Canada contestants